Back To Front is the fifth studio album by French-Belgian singer Viktor Lazlo. A French version of the album was recorded and released in France, entitled Verso. The album was her first album not to be released on Polydor Records but on East/West Records.

Lazlo had started to work on the album in 1992 according to East/West Records' press release. The album was recorded on the Bahamas. The album cover features a nude backside of Viktor Lazlo with jewels of Christian Lacroix in her hair. Lazlo explains the album cover as follows: "Up until now I have always been reduced to my looks and my fancy clothes to the extend that I often didn't know who I really was. I just didn't want to continue like that."  In an interview with Het Nieuwsblad she continued: "I'm thrilled. An entire day of interviews, and no one has asked a thing about my clothes. For the first time in my career, they aren't talking about beauty or fashion, but about music. For the first time they are really interested in my music.Two songs were written by Shelly Peiken and Albert Hammond, one of them being the song Have Mercy, which had previously been recorded by Yazz. Among the guest musicians on this album were Sly and Robbie, responsible for drum programming and bass.

Singles
Two singles were released off the album My Love (entitled Ces rêves in France) and Turn It All Around (entitled Babe in France). East/West Records shot videos for both singles, which can still be found on YouTube these days.

Reviews
The German magazine Audio.de gave three out of five possible stars. David Jeffries wrote on AllMusic that reviews for Back To Front'' were "overwhelmingly positive".

Track listing

References

Notes

1996 albums
Viktor Lazlo albums
East West Records albums